Mykel DeAnthony Williams (born June 29, 2004) is an American football defensive end for the Georgia Bulldogs. In January 2022, he was named the Maxwell Football National High School Defensive Player of the Year. He was also rated by 247Sports as the No. 4 recruit in college football's class of 2022.

Early years
Williams attended Hardaway High School in Columbus, Georgia. After his senior season, he was named the Maxwell Football National High School Defensive Player of the Year.

Recruiting
Williams "received national attention" early in his high school football career.  He was ranked by 247Sports as the No. 4 recruit in college football's class of 2022. 247Sports compared Williams to Rashan Gary, citing his "outstanding frame" and "elite length." He has also been compared to Travon Walker, Nolan Smith calling Williams the spitting image of Walker. Rivals.com rated him as the No. 8 recruit in the nation. ESPN rated him at No. 23 in its 2022 ESPN 300.

University of Georgia
Williams initially committed to USC, but flipped to Georgia in October 2021. He was the highest-rated recruit signed by defending national champion Georgia in the 2022 recruiting cycle. In July 2022, Georgia head coach Kirby Smart said of Williams: "The number one thing that stands out about Mykel is his work ethic. . . . I'm excited for him. . . . He's a great young man."

As a true freshman in 2022, CBS Sports rated him as a "freshman to watch", and ESPN rated him as a preseason true freshman All-American. He played in Georgia's 2022 season opener against No. 11 Oregon and registered two quarterback hurries. At the end of the season, he was named to Pro Football Focus's PFF True Freshman All-America team.

References

External links
 Georgia Bulldogs bio

Living people
American football defensive ends
Georgia Bulldogs football players
Players of American football from Georgia (U.S. state)
2004 births